Joseph Branch may refer to:
 Joseph Branch (judge) (1915–1991), American jurist and North Carolina politician
 Joseph Branch (Florida politician), American lawyer and politician
 Joseph Gerald Branch II (died 1867), his son, American slave owner and state legislator in Florida

See also
 Joe Branch, a stream in Hickman County, Tennessee, United States